Jerrion Zawasky Ealy (born August 19, 2000) is an American football wide receiver and running back for the Kansas City Chiefs of the National Football League (NFL). He played college football at Ole Miss.

Early years
Ealy attended Jackson Preparatory School in Flowood, Mississippi. During his career, he rushed for over 5,000 yards with 84 touchdowns. He was the MVP of the 2019 Under Armour All-American Game after rushing for a game record 116 yards and two touchdowns. A five-star recruit, Ealy committed to play college football and college baseball at the University of Mississippi (Ole Miss).

Also a top baseball recruit, Ealy played in the 2018 Under Armour All-America Baseball Game. He was drafted by the Arizona Diamondbacks in the 31st round of the 2019 Major League Baseball Draft, but did not sign and attended Ole Miss.

College career
As a true freshman in football at Ole Miss in 2019, Ealy played in all 12 games. Against Southeastern Louisiana, he set a school record for all-purpose yards in a game with 273. Overall he rushed for 722 yards over 104 carries with eight total touchdowns. As a freshman baseball player in 2020, Ealy played in 13 games before the season was suspended due to the COVID-19 pandemic.

Professional career

Ealy was signed by the Kansas City Chiefs as an undrafted free agent in 2022. He was waived on August 30, 2022 and signed to the practice squad the next day. He was suspended for six games for a PED violation on October 3, 2022. Ealy won his first Super Bowl ring when the Chiefs defeated the Philadelphia Eagles in Super Bowl LVII. He signed a reserve/future contract on February 15, 2023.

References

External links
 Kansas City Chiefs bio
Ole Miss Rebels football bio
Ole Miss Rebels baseball bio

2000 births
Living people
People from Walnut Grove, Mississippi
Players of American football from Mississippi
American football running backs
Baseball outfielders
Ole Miss Rebels football players
Ole Miss Rebels baseball players